Qujur may refer to:
 Qujur, East Azerbaijan
 Qujur-e Olya, East Azerbaijan Province
 Qujur-e Sofla, East Azerbaijan Province
 Qujur, Zanjan